The Tactical Supply Wing (TSW) is a helicopter support unit of the Royal Air Force, based at MOD Stafford (also known as Beacon Barracks) in Staffordshire. The wing specialises in the refuelling of helicopters in the field.

History 
The Tactical Supply Wing concept was devised by Group Captain Craven-Griffiths, who developed the idea during his time at the Ministry of Defence in London during the late 1960s. Griffiths and colleagues spent many hours discussing the concept in The Old Shades public house, located on Whitehall. Ever since, the Old Shades has been considered as the birthplace of the TSW.

Also known by some former members as "Tiswas", the TSW was formed at RAF Stafford in late 1970 and became operational in January 1971.

TSW was sent on its first operational deployment to Northern Ireland in 1971. Elements of TSW have deployed around the world to support British and NATO helicopter units in most major exercises and conflicts since it was formed.

Role and operations 
TSW's primary role is supporting the deployment of helicopter operations, specialising in providing rotors-turning refuelling to helicopters and field refuelling of fixed-wing aircraft; this can done from the back of a transport aircraft, or deploy-able storage facilities, such as bowsers or pillow tanks, often in the field or at austere temporary sites.

The unit is still at Stafford, but the base is now called Beacon Barracks which houses 22 Signal Regiment, 16 Signal Regiment and 1 Signal Regiment.

Heritage 
The wing's badge, awarded in March 1992, features a Peregrine falcon in a flying position, against a background of a three-arched bridge and a body of water. The aggressive falcon with its wings fully extended resonates with a “Supply Wing” whereas the bridge represents communication and is portrayed with three arches, which is a reference to three RAF commands and all three services of the British Armed Forces.

The wing's motto is Support to Strike, acknowledging its support role which supports combat operations.

References

Royal Air Force wings
Military units and formations established in 1970